Frederick I (Danish and ; ; ; 7 October 1471 – 10 April 1533) was King of Denmark and Norway. He was the last Roman Catholic monarch to reign over Denmark and Norway, when subsequent monarchs embraced Lutheranism after the Protestant Reformation. As king of Norway, Frederick is most remarkable in never having visited the country and was never crowned as such.  Therefore, he was styled  King of Denmark, the Vends and the Goths, elected King of Norway. Frederick's reign began the enduring tradition of calling kings of Denmark alternatively by the names Christian and Frederick, which has continued up to the reign of the current monarch, Margrethe II.

Background
Frederick was the younger son of the first Oldenburg King Christian I of Denmark, Norway and Sweden (1426–81) and of Dorothea of Brandenburg (1430–95).  Soon after the death of his father, the underage Frederick was elected co-Duke of Schleswig and Holstein in 1482, the other co-duke being his elder brother, King John of Denmark. In 1490 at Frederick's majority, both duchies were divided between the brothers.

In 1500 he had convinced his brother King John to conquer Dithmarschen. A great army was called from not only the duchies, but with additions from all of the Kalmar Union for which his brother briefly was king.  In addition, numerous German mercenaries took part. The expedition failed miserably, however, in the Battle of Hemmingstedt, where one third of all knights of Schleswig and Holstein lost their lives.

Reign
When his brother, King John died, a group of Jutish nobles had offered Frederick the throne as early as 1513, but he had declined, rightly believing that the majority of the Danish nobility would be loyal to his nephew Christian II. In 1523, Christian was forced by disloyal nobles to abdicate as king of Denmark and Norway, and Frederick took the throne of Denmark in 1523, and was elected king of Norway in 1524. It is not certain that Frederick ever learned to speak Danish. After becoming king, he continued spending most of his time at Gottorp, a castle and estate in the city of Schleswig.

In 1524 and 1525 Frederick had to suppress revolts among the peasants in Agder, Jutland and Scania who demanded the restoration of Christian II. The high point of the rebellion came in 1525 when Søren Norby, the governor (statholder) of Gotland, invaded Blekinge in an attempt to restore Christian II to power. He raised 8000 men who besieged Kärnan (Helsingborgs slott), a castle in Helsingborg.  Frederick's general, Johann Rantzau, moved his army to Scania and defeated the peasants soundly in April and May 1525.

Frederick played a central role in the spread of Lutheran teaching throughout Denmark.  In his coronation charter, he was made the solemn protector (værner) of Roman Catholicism in Denmark.  In that role, he asserted his right to select bishops for the Roman Catholic dioceses in the country. Christian II had been intolerant of Protestant teaching, but Frederick took a more opportunist approach. For example, he ordered that Lutherans and Roman Catholics share the same churches and encouraged the first publication of the Bible in the  Danish language. In 1526, when Lutheran Reformer Hans Tausen was threatened with arrest and trial for heresy, Frederick appointed him his personal chaplain to give him immunity.

Starting in 1527, Frederick authorized the closure of Franciscan houses and monasteries in 28 Danish cities. He used the popular anti-establishment feelings that ran against some persons of the Roman Catholic hierarchy and nobility of Denmark as well as keen propaganda to decrease the power of bishops and Roman Catholic nobles. 
 
During his reign,  Frederick was skillful enough to prevent all-out warfare between Protestants and Roman Catholics. In 1532 he succeeded in capturing Christian II who had tried to invade Norway, and to make himself king of the country. Frederick died on 10 April 1533 in Gottorp, at the age of 61, and was buried in Schleswig Cathedral.  Upon Frederick's death, tensions between Roman Catholics and Protestants rose to a fever pitch which would result in the Count's Feud (Grevens Fejde).

Family and children

On 10 April 1502, Frederick married Anna of Brandenburg (1487–1514), the daughter of John Cicero, Elector of Brandenburg and Margaret of Thuringia. The couple had two children:

 Christian III, King of Denmark and Norway (12 August 1503 – 1 January 1559)
 Dorothea of Denmark (1 August 1504 – 11 April 1547), married 1 July 1526 to Albert, Duke of Prussia.

Frederick's wife Anna died on 5 May 1514, 26 years old. Four years later on 9 October 1518 at Kiel, Frederick married Sophie of Pomerania (20 years old; 1498–1568), a daughter of Bogislaw "the Great", Duke of Pomerania. Sophie and Frederick had six children:

 John II of Denmark, Duke of Schleswig-Holstein-Haderslev (28 June 1521 – 2 October 1580)
 Elizabeth of Denmark (14 October 1524 – 15 October 1586), married:
 on 26 August 1543 to Magnus III of Mecklenburg-Schwerin.
 on 14 February 1556 to Ulrich III, Duke of Mecklenburg-Güstrow.
 Adolf of Denmark, Duke of Holstein-Gottorp (25 January 1526 – 1 October 1586)
 Anna of Denmark (1527 – 4 June 1535)
 Dorothea of Denmark (1528 – 11 November 1575), married on 27 October 1573 to Christopher, Duke of Mecklenburg-Gadebusch.
 Frederick of Denmark (13 April 1532 – 27 October 1556), Prince-Bishop of Hildesheim and Bishop of Schleswig.

References

Citations

Bibliography

External links

 The Royal Lineage at the website of the Danish Monarchy

|-

|-

1471 births
1533 deaths
16th-century Norwegian monarchs
Roman Catholic monarchs
Dukes of Schleswig
Dukes of Holstein
People of the Swedish War of Liberation
15th-century Danish people
16th-century monarchs of Denmark
Sons of kings
Children of Christian I of Denmark